Rythem's eleventh single is titled  and it was released on February 28, 2007 under Sony Music Entertainment Japan label. The single was meant to be released in time for the spring season of 2007. The title track was used as the ending theme for the anime series Deltora Quest. This single peaked at the #42 spot in the Oricon weekly charts.

The item's stock number is AICL-1806.

Track listing
Sakura Uta
Composition/Lyrics: Yui Nītsu
Arrangement: Satoshi Takebe
Kasumizakura
Composition/Lyrics: Rythem
Arrangement: Satoshi Takebe
Sakura Uta (Acoustic ver.)
Sakura Uta (instrumental)

2007 singles
Rythem songs
2007 songs